Richard Marshall (born ) is a professional rugby league coach who was until most recently the Head Coach of the Salford Red Devils in the Betfred Super League and a former Ireland international rugby league footballer who played as a  or  forward in the 1990s and 2000s.

Playing career
He is a former professional rugby league footballer who played in the 1990s and 2000s. He played at representative level for Ireland, and at club level for Halifax, Huddersfield-Sheffield Giants, London Broncos, Leigh Centurions and the Swinton Lions

International honours
Marshall won 2 caps for Ireland in 2003 while at the London Broncos.

Coaching career
He is the 2019 and 2020 Grand Final Winning assistant coach for St Helens, and at the end of the 2020 season he was announced as the successor to Ian Watson to take over the head coach role at the Salford Red Devils, after he had left to join the Huddersfield Giants.

On 22 September 2021 it was reported that he had left his role of head coach of Salford Red Devils by mutual consent after the club finished the 2021 Super League season in second last place on the table.

References

External links
Lions' den the home of some familiar faces for Wolves youngsters

1975 births
Living people
Halifax R.L.F.C. coaches
Halifax R.L.F.C. players
Huddersfield Giants players
Ireland national rugby league team players
Leigh Leopards players
London Broncos players
Rugby league players from Warrington
Rugby league props
Rugby league second-rows
Salford Red Devils coaches
Swinton Lions players